Justice Ellis may refer to:

Abram Halstead Ellis (1847–1902), associate justice of the Kansas Supreme Court
Overton G. Ellis (1860–1940), associate justice of the Washington Supreme Court
Powhatan Ellis (1790–1863), associate justice of the Mississippi Supreme Court
Richard Ellis (Texas politician) (1781–1846), associate justice of the Alabama Supreme Court
W. H. Ellis (1867–1948), associate justice of the Florida Supreme Court

See also
Judge Ellis (disambiguation)